Salem was a New Zealand record label that lasted from the mid 1960s to the early 1970s.

Background
The label was owned by Peter Caithness. Both Caithness and co-founder, Dennis Bailey were formerly employees with the Viking label. The label which was headquartered in Wellington had a 75% Polynesian catalogue in 1968. Some of the popular releases included Herma Keil & The Keil Isles with their Keils A-Go-Go! album, and the various artists album An Evening At Tommo's Place, which featured Bridgette Allen, Ray Woolf and Martin Kini.

Ethnic releases

Catalogue (selective)

Popular and Jazz

References

Ethnic music record labels
New Zealand independent record labels
Oceanian music